James Hamilton, 3rd Lord Hamilton, Baron of Strabane (1633–1655) fought against the Cromwellian conquest of Ireland together with his stepfather Phelim O'Neill. In the Siege of Charlemont of 1650, they defended the fort against Coote, but had eventually to surrender. In 1655 Lord Strabane accidentally drowned in the River Mourne near Strabane, aged about 22 and was succeeded by his brother George.

Birth and origins 
James was born in 1633 probably at Strabane Castle, as the eldest son of Claude Hamilton and his wife Jean Gordon. His father was the 2nd Baron Hamilton of Strabane, a member of the Strabane cadet branch of the Abercorns. James's mother was the fourth daughter of George Gordon, 1st Marquess of Huntly. His parents had married in 1632. James had one brother and two sister, which are listed in his father's article.

Baron Strabane 
Hamilton succeeded his father in 1638 at the age of about five. His mother ran the family estate for the yond Lord Strabane, as he was now, and they continued to live in the Castle of Strabane.

Irish wars 
In 1641, when Strabane was about eight years old, the Irish Rebellion broke out. The rebel leader Phelim O'Neill captured and burnt Strabane Castle and took him, his mother, and his siblings captive. Phelim brought them to his castle in Kinard but released them after a few days and sent them to "Sir George Hamilton". This could have been Sir George of Donalong or his great-uncle Sir George Hamilton of Greenlaw and Roscrea.

In 1649, when he was about 16, during the Irish Confederate Wars, Strabane Castle was attacked again, this time by Robert Monro and his Covenanter army. The castle was relieved by Phelim O'Neill, its previous attacker. Phelim married his mother in November. Phelim became his stepfather and his half-brother Gordon O'Neill was born.

In 1649 Oliver Cromwell invaded Ireland with the Parliamentarian forces. On 21 June 1650 the Confederate Ulster Army lost the Battle of Scarrifholis. His stepfather fought in the battle and then fled and escaped capture. In July 1650, aged about 17, Strabane joined his stepfather in his fight against the Parliamentarians. Together with Phelim O'Neill he defended Charlemont Fort in the Siege of Charlemont against Charles Coote, 1st Earl of Mountrath. The fort surrendered to Coote on terms on the 6th or on the 14th of August 1650. The garrison was allowed to march to a port to go overseas into foreign service.

Lord Strabane, however, did not want to leave the country. He therefore escaped and hid in the woods and bogs of the Munterlony mountains where he was captured soon after. He then sought Coote's protection; but in December, he returned to his old cause and took up arms again with Phelim O'Neill. His lands, comprising among others what is today called the Baronscourt Estate, were confiscated. In 1652 Phelim O'Neill was captured. He was tried and convicted for treason in October and executed.

Death and timeline 
Strabane drowned in the River Mourne at Ballyfatten near Strabane in 1655, aged about 22. He had never married and was succeeded by his younger brother George as the 4th Baron of Strabane.

Notes and references

Notes

Citations

Sources 

  – 1642 to 1660 (for Scarrisholis and Charlemont)
  – G to K (for Hamilton of Strabane)
  – Ab-Adam to Basing (for Abercorn)
 
  – (for timeline)
  – Short biographies in the biographical notes
 
  – Abercorn to Balmerino (for Abercorn)
 

1633 births
1655 deaths
17th-century Irish people
Barons in the Peerage of Ireland
James
People from County Tyrone
People of the Irish Confederate Wars